Annette Sinclair is a movie and television actress. She was previously married to the rock musician Bob Seger.

Filmography

References

External links

Living people
American film actresses
American television actresses
20th-century American actresses
21st-century American actresses
Year of birth missing (living people)